The Nasoni are a Native American tribe from eastern Texas and southwestern Arkansas.

History
The Nasoni were divided into two bands. The Upper Nasoni, who lived along the Red River in the southwestern corner of Arkansas. They were affiliated with the Kadohadacho branch of the Caddo Confederacy. The Lower Nasoni, who lived between the Sabine and Angelina Rivers in present-day Rusk County, Texas. They were part of the 
branch of the Caddo Confederacy.

Hernando De Soto encountered the Lower Nasoni in 1541. During René-Robert Cavelier, Sieur de La Salle's 1686 expedition, members of his party were greeted by the Lower Nasoni and carried into their town for welcoming festivities.

During the 17th through 19th centuries, European diseases, particularly smallpox, wreaked havoc upon Nasoni and other Caddo groups, forcing them to consolidate for survival.

In 1719, French explorers established a fort and trading post on the Red River, Le Poste des Cadodaquious, opposite of an Upper Nasoni village. They traded firearms, ammunition, metal tools, beads, clothing, and accessories for hides and horses. The Upper Nasoni allied with the French from 1719 to 1762.

In 1716, Spanish monks founded the San José de los Nazones Mission to serve the Nadaco and the Lower Nasoni tribes. The Lower Nasoni allied with the Spanish during the 18th century. By 1880, their population had been so ravaged by disease, that it is believed they assimilated into the Nadaco tribe.

Today, Nasoni people are enrolled in the Caddo Nation, headquartered in Binger, Oklahoma.

Synonymy
Hernando De Soto referred to the tribe as the Nassohone. The Lower Nasoni were called Nasaya, Nasayaha, Nasayaya, Nasoui, Nassoni, Nassonite, Nazone, Nazoni. The Nasoni were also called Assony and Nisohoni.

Notes

References
 Bolton, Herbet E. The Hasinais: Southern Caddoans As Seen by the Earliest Europeans. Norman: University of Oklahoma Press, 2002. .
 Sturtevant, William C., general editor and Raymond D. Fogelson, volume editor. Handbook of North American Indians: Southeast. Volume 14. Washington DC: Smithsonian Institution, 2004. .

External links
Nasoni Indians, Handbook of Texas Online
The Nasoni Tribe and the Mission of San Jose, from Access Genealogy

Caddoan peoples
Native American tribes in Arkansas
Native American tribes in Texas
Native American history of Arkansas
Native American history of Texas

hr:Upper Nasoni